"I Always Feel Like Somebody's Watchin' Me" is the third episode of the sixth season of the American television medical drama Grey's Anatomy, and the show's 105th episode overall. It was written by Tony Phelan and Joan Rater, and directed by Michael Pressman. The episode was originally broadcast on the American Broadcasting Company (ABC) in the United States on October 1, 2009. In the episode, the physicians of Seattle Grace struggle to maintain their jobs as the hospital merges with Mercy West. Further storylines include Dr. Izzie Stevens (Katherine Heigl) returning to work full-time, too quickly after her surgery, and Dr. Cristina Yang (Sandra Oh) working under Dr. Arizona Robbins (Jessica Capshaw).

Although the episode was fictionally set in Seattle, Washington, filming primarily took place in Los Angeles, California. Adrienne Barbeau and James Frain made their first guest appearances, while Sarah Utterback, Mark Saul, and Molly Kidder reprised their roles as guest-stars. The episode's title refers to the song "I Always Feel Like", by American hip hop group TRU. "I Always Feel Like Somebody's Watchin' Me" opened to positive critical reviews, with Chyler Leigh's (Dr. Lexie Grey) and Oh's performance praised in particular. Upon its initial airing, the episode was viewed by 15.69 million Americans, and garnered a 6.1/16 Nielsen rating/share in the 18–49 demographic, ranking #3 for the night in terms of viewership.

Plot
Dr. Cristina Yang (Sandra Oh) tries to convince pediatric surgeon Dr. Arizona Robbins (Jessica Capshaw) to place her on her service, to which she agrees. A trauma victim is brought into the emergency room, with the surgical residents all trying to impress the superior physicians, in hope that their job will be preserved, come the merger. Dr. Izzie Stevens (Katherine Heigl) returns to full-time work quickly after her cancer treatment, showcasing an auburn wig.

Dr. Lexie Grey (Chyler Leigh) is assigned to the trauma victim, and while transferring blood to the operating room, she slips while running. Dismayed with the merger, Dr. Derek Shepherd (Patrick Dempsey) condemns the chief of surgery Dr. Richard Webber (James Pickens Jr.) for initiating it, only to be yelled at. Dr. Meredith Grey (Ellen Pompeo) is optimistic, assuring everyone that they will keep their jobs. A patient, Jodie Crawley (Adrienne Barbeau), and her son with schizophrenia, Tom (James Frain), is brought into the hospital with a moving growth inside her stomach, claimed to be an alien by her son.

Yang expresses difficulty connecting with the children on pediatrics, to Robbins' disappointment. Tom becomes frightened when he notices Lexie is not wearing a name tag, so he attacks her and runs away. His mother is subsequently diagnosed with an abdominal aortic aneurysm, for which requires surgery, and Tom falls down the stairs, for which also requires surgery. Dr. Callie Torres (Sara Ramirez) returns to the hospital, and informs Robbins that Yang is just sucking up. The Crawley's are uneasy about agreeing to surgery, but Dr. Miranda Bailey (Chandra Wilson) convinces them that it is the right thing to do. An obstetrics and gynecology resident accidentally cuts off a baby's arm during a caesarian section, but it is healed by plastic surgeon Dr. Mark Sloan (Eric Dane), Robbins, and Yang. Stevens assists Shepherd with a five-hour craniotomy, and Karev is fearful that she cannot handle it, although she is ultimately able to complete the surgery. At the conclusion of the episode, human resources sends out an email notifying Olivia Harper (Sarah Utterback) and Dr. Steve Mostow (Mark Saul)'s wife Megan (Molly Kidder), that they have been fired.

Production

The episode was written by Tony Phelan and Joan Rater, and directed by Michael Pressman. David Greenspan edited the episode, and Donald Lee Harris served as production designer. The episode's title refers to the song "I Always Feel Like", by American hip hop group TRU. Featured music includes Gossip's "Pop Goes the World" and Ingrid Michaelson's "The Chain".

Rater intended the theme of the episode to be "paranoia", elaborating: "After Richard dropped the bomb that the hospital would be merging with Mercy West, we knew that this episode would have to deal with people's paranoia. Because merger means change. And change means fear. And the worst kind of fear is the kind that lives in your head. The dark thoughts. The paranoia. The worst case scenarios that you play out that usually don't come true. And with Richard holing himself up inside his office, it's just a breeding ground for rumor, fear and paranoia. So, when we started talking about this episode, the theme of paranoia emerged pretty quickly." All storylines in the episode were inspired by Rater's friend base, including the story on schizophrenia. She offered her insight: 

At the conclusion of the episode, several physicians played a game of baseball to cheer up. Rater called it "her favorite scene", explaining: "I loved the scene where Owen, Derek and Mark take Cristina, Meredith and Lexie to the baseball field. This is one of the first times Owen has seen Cristina's intensity. And I love that he makes her leave the hospital, focus on something else. That's why he's so good for her. The scene was actually inspired by Shonda saying, let's do a scene where they're all playing baseball. But when I finally saw it, it makes me want to write more scenes like that, with our doctors outside of the hospital, little glimpses of them in real life."

Reception

Broadcasting 
"I Always Feel Like Somebody's Watchin' Me" was first broadcast on October 1, 2009 in the United States on ABC. The episode was viewed by a total of 15.69 million Americans, down 1.34% from the previous episode "Goodbye", which garnered 17.03 million viewers. In terms of viewership, "I Always Feel Like Somebody's Watchin' Me" ranked third for the night, just behind CBS's juggernauts CSI and The Mentalist. The episode did not win in viewership, but its 6.1/16 Nielsen rating ranked first in its 9:00 Eastern time-slot and the entire night, for both the rating and share percentages of the key 18–49 demographic, beating out CSI, The Mentalist, Private Practice, and The Office. Although its rating won for the night, it was a decrease from the previous episode, which garnered a 6.7/17 rating/share in the 18–49 demographic.

Critical reception 

The episode was generally well received among television critics. Steve Marsi of TV Fanatic called Yang being on pediatrics "an epic-fail", but praised the humor given by Oh. He also called Lexie's storyline "endearing and sad to watch", writing that overall, the episode was "classic Grey's Anatomy". PopSugar gave a positive review of the episode, writing: "Derek and Mark seem to be the only ones who are keeping their cool." However, they also felt that Meredith was "out of character", commenting: "Though Meredith also kept it together, her optimism is so out of character that it can only be chalked up to the crisis, and even she recognizes it." While Yang was on pediatric service, she impersonated a bear, and PopSugar called her voice "priceless". They were also positive about Stevens' storyline, saying: "At first it seemed super annoying but was pretty sweet by the end of the episode." PopSugar also enjoyed Lexie's storyline, commenting that "she proves her worth in the end".

Cinema Blend Amanda Krill said Stevens' wig looked like a "Stepford Wives wig", adding: "Everyone has a hard time not looking at it. She's still a cancer patient, but she knows that her job is on the line just like everyone else's. Everyone is working round the clock, showing up at every call, and the Chief is acting like a maniacal overlord." Krill also enjoyed Oh's performance as Yang, writing: "Cristina dealing with children is almost laughable – and actually provides a chuckle or two in this tense episode. Miss C thinks she is striking gold by moving to peds, because she will be able to do all types of surgery, and on little people, which makes the surgery harder, which is of course, better. Things don't turn out as planned, though, when she realizes kids are a little more resilient than their adult counterparts. And then Callie outs her to Arizona – in the she doesn’t really like kids sense of outing." Krill enjoyed Wilson's performance as Bailey, in addition to Dane's, writing: "He wins the best line of the show with 'That’s how I know my job is safe, Yang – I reattach babies arms.'"

Michael Pascua of The Huffington Post disliked Stevens' wig, writing: "Izzie's wig looked horrible. She looked exactly like her mother Robbie and that's not a compliment. I loved Cristina's Stepford wife joke and how everyone, including Derek, couldn't help but stare at her hair. Yet, no one had the balls to tell her it was bad." Pascua also enjoyed Leigh's performance as Lexie, commenting: "This was one episode I felt that Lexie was a genuine character. She still maintained that book-smart ability to repeat facts (like the merger cases) and shows a command of medical situations." He too found Oh's bear voice comical, adding: "I laughed when Cristina attempted to do her voice for Mr. Bear because you knew that she didn't know what she was doing." Pascua was shocked with the departure of Utterbacks' character, writing: "I can't believe that they cut Nurse Olivia. I understand that she wasn't really around, but having her as a tertiary character was nice. It was kind of ass-y of the chief not to personally tell these people that they were being cut, but it made Derek look really chivalrous."

References

External links
"I Always Feel Like Somebody's Watchin' Me" at ABC.com

Grey's Anatomy (season 6) episodes
2009 American television episodes